Cono may refer to 

 Cono Christian School, a Presbyterian church near Walker, Iowa
 City of New Orleans (train), a passenger train operated by Amtrak from New Orleans, Louisiana, to Chicago, Illinois
 Cono Township, Buchanan County, Iowa, one of sixteen townships in Buchanan County, Iowa

See also
Cuno (disambiguation)